Renaud Kerbrat is a French gun designer and inventor. He is the owner or co-owner of various patents related to armament and precision technology.

Born in Brittany, France, Renaud Kerbrat worked for various companies manufacturing ammunition and weapons in France and Belgium before establishing a company in Switzerland and creating weapons using his patented designs.

Firearm design work

Renaud Kerbrat has designed a number of firearm actions claimed to eliminate most of the weapon's muzzle jump and recoil, thus making them more controllable during automatic fire. Kerbrat's work as a small arms designer has resulted in several patents being granted by the US Patent Office. The TDI VectorKRISS_Vector submachine gun family manufactured in the USA are thus far the only production weapons to use Kerbrat's designs; in this case, the so-called "Super V" system, a blowback action using an off-axis recoil track for the block and bolt.
[]

External links
 
 New 2010 Patent
 Kriss (Vector gun) story https://smallarmsreview.com/transformational-defense-industries-inc-home-of-the-kriss-super-v-system/

Firearm designers
Living people
Year of birth missing (living people)